Minstrel Man is a 1944 American musical drama film directed by Joseph H. Lewis and produced by Producers Releasing Corporation (PRC). It was a vehicle for Broadway and vaudeville headliner Benny Fields.

Plot 
Singing star Dixie Boy Johnson and his wife Caroline are jubilant over Dixie's headlining a Broadway show and Caroline's impending motherhood. On opening night, Caroline is rushed to the hospital and Dixie begs to leave the theater and join her, but producer Lew Dunn refuses. Caroline dies in childbirth and Dixie is shattered. He leaves the baby in the care of his friends, Lasses and Mae, and drops out of sight. Presumed dead, Dixie stays undercover and takes an assumed name, as a shipboard entertainer.

Years later, Dunn grooms Dixie's daughter Caroline for stardom in a revival of Dixie's Broadway show. Dixie's former agent Bill Evans sees an opportunity to sue Dunn for damages, and arranges for Dixie to confront his daughter and his old friends.

Cast 
Benny Fields as Dixie Boy Johnson
Gladys George as Mae White
Alan Dinehart as Lew Dunn
Roscoe Karns as Lasses White
Jerome Cowan as Bill Evans
Judy Clark as Caroline (daughter, age 16)
Molly Lamont as (Mrs.) Caroline Johnson
John Raitt as Finale Singer

Production 
Production began in late 1943, but was shut down for four weeks and retooled when various cast and crew members became unavailable. Director Joseph H. Lewis was drafted during production; he was briefly replaced by Edgar G. Ulmer and then Wallace W. Fox. Lewis was released from the army in March 1944 and completed the film.

Female lead Binnie Barnes had a prior commitment to Metro-Goldwyn-Mayer and had to drop out; she was replaced by Gladys George. The juvenile role was intended for PRC contractee Gerra Young, who was sidelined by illness; she was replaced by Judy Clark. Character comedian Lee "Lasses" White was replaced by a bigger name, Roscoe Karns; Karns's screen character is still named "Lasses White." White himself remained in the film as "Tiny," featured in the minstrel-show sequence. Production resumed after the scheduling conflicts of cast and crew were resolved.

Producer Leon Fromkess originally budgeted Minstrel Man at $80,000, slightly above average for the very-low-budget PRC studio. When Fromkess saw how well the project was progressing, he allocated more money. Composer Harry Revel co-wrote the original songs with Paul Francis Webster; Revel was equally impressed with the project and invested his own money, earning an "associate producer" credit. The final budget was "more than $200,000", according to Variety.

Reception
PRC's most elaborate production was booked into many major first-run theater chains. Minstrel Man became the biggest critical and financial success the company enjoyed. The film was nominated for two Academy Awards: Best Original Score (Ferde Grofé and Leo Erdody) and Best Original Song (Harry Revel and Paul Francis Webster).

Songs
 "Remember Me to Carolina" (Harry Revel, Paul Francis Webster; Academy Award nominee) – Benny Fields
 "I Don't Care If the World Knows About It" (Revel, Webster) – Fields; reprise by Judy Clark
 "Cindy" (Revel, Webster) – Fields; reprise by Clark
 "My Bamboo Cane" (Revel, Webster) – Fields
 "My Melancholy Baby" (Ernie Burnett, George A. Norton) – Fields
 "Shaking Hands with the Sun" (Revel, Webster) – John Raitt
 "Minstrel Man" – Minstrel chorus, danced by Johnny Boyle

References

External links 

1944 films
1944 musical films
Blackface minstrel shows and films
1940s English-language films
American black-and-white films
Producers Releasing Corporation films
Films directed by Joseph H. Lewis
American musical films
1940s American films